Dithny Joan Raton (born 10 September 1974) is a Haitian politician who was the country's Minister for Culture in Haiti's Cabinet between 2015 and 2017.

Personal life
Raton studied at the Alcibiades Pommayrac in Jacmel. Her ambition was once to be a professional dancer.

Career
Raton has worked as an administrator. In 2015, Raton became Haiti's Minister for Culture. As Minister, Raton has tried to increase the use of Haitian Creole, and has dedicated October to the language. In August 2015, Raton and Barbados' Minister of Culture, Stephen Lashley met to create a cultural agreement. In 2017, Limond Toussaint became Minister of Culture in Jovenel Moïse's government.

References

21st-century Haitian politicians
21st-century Haitian women politicians
1974 births
Living people